The Weitz Center for Creativity is an academic building at Carleton College, located in Northfield, Minnesota, United States. Formerly a middle school and high school, it opened in the fall of 2011. In addition to classrooms, the center houses the Perlman Teaching Museum, a theater, and two dance studios. In 2017, a new addition for music and performing arts was completed, adding a performance hall, rehearsal spaces, and faculty offices. The building is LEED gold certified.

The building was funded by Wally Weitz and the Weitz Family who have contributed over $45 million in total gifts to the college.

References 

University and college arts centers in the United States